Jonathan Michael Hayes (born August 11, 1962) is an American football coach and former tight end who is currently offensive coordinator of the Arlington Renegades of the XFL. He previously served as the head coach of St. Louis Battlehawks as well as tight ends coach for Cincinnati Bengals of the National Football League (NFL).

Playing career
Hayes played college football for Iowa from 1982 to 1984, and was drafted in the 2nd round of the 1985 NFL Draft. He played for the Kansas City Chiefs (1985–1993) and the Pittsburgh Steelers (1994–1996).

Coaching career

Oklahoma
Hayes's coaching career began at Oklahoma under Bob Stoops. While coaching in Norman, the 2000 Oklahoma Sooners football team won the BCS National Championship Game. At Oklahoma, Hayes coached Trent Smith, who was named to the 2001 and 2002 All-Big 12 Conference football team.

Cincinnati Bengals
Hayes joined Marvin Lewis's Cincinnati Bengals staff in 2003 and won 4 AFC North titles on the way to 7 NFL playoff berths. Hayes also coached several Pro Bowl players; Tyler Eifert (2015), and Jermaine Gresham (2011, 2012), 

In January 2018, Hayes was the head coach of the East team in the 2018 East–West Shrine Game.

St. Louis BattleHawks
On April 18, 2019, Hayes was announced as the first head coach and general manager of the St. Louis BattleHawks franchise in the revived XFL.

Dallas Renegades
On June 9, 2022, Dallas Renegades head coach Bob Stoops hired Hayes to serve as his offensive coordinator for the 2023 XFL season.

Head coaching record

XFL

Personal life
Hayes's son, Jaxson, starred on the 2018–19 Texas Longhorns men's basketball team as a freshman and declared for the 2019 NBA draft. He was selected 8th overall by the Atlanta Hawks in the 2019 NBA Draft before being traded to the New Orleans Pelicans. Hayes's daughter, Jillian, committed as a member of the 2020 recruiting class to play college basketball at the University of Cincinnati. Hayes's wife, Kristi, was a scholarship basketball player at Drake and college women's basketball coach before getting married.

References

Further reading

External links
Career stats at pro-football-reference.com

1962 births
Living people
People from South Fayette Township, Allegheny County, Pennsylvania
American football tight ends
Cincinnati Bengals coaches
Iowa Hawkeyes football players
Kansas City Chiefs players
Oklahoma Sooners football coaches
Pittsburgh Steelers players
Players of American football from Pennsylvania
Sportspeople from the Pittsburgh metropolitan area
St. Louis BattleHawks coaches